Hoseynabad-e Mahlar or Hoseynabad-e Mohlar may refer to:
 Hoseynabad-e Mahlar-e Olya
 Hoseynabad-e Mahlar-e Sofla